The City of Kingston is a local government area in Victoria, Australia in the south-eastern suburbs of Melbourne, its northern boundary lying approximately 15 km from the Melbourne city centre along the north-eastern shorelines of Port Phillip. It covers an area of 91 km² and has an estimated population of 163,431 people.

History

The City of Kingston area was originally governed by the Moorabbin Roads Board, which formed in 1862 and became a shire council in 1871, covering a large area of mixed agricultural and semi-urban land. After years of agitation, in 1917 the seaside town of Sandringham became a borough with its own council, and this fuelled the desire of those living in towns further south to combine their efforts and demand self-representation. This finally occurred in May 1920 and the "Borough of Mordialloc and Mentone" was formed. It became a town in 1923 and the City of Mordialloc in 1926.

The City of Moorabbin had a population of 109,588 by the time of the 1971 census.

In 1994, the state government amalgamated local councils all over Victoria, as part of its local government reform.  The new City of Kingston was one result, and on 15 December 1994 the City was formally Gazetted comprising all of the City of Chelsea, most of the City of Mordialloc, a substantial portion of the City of Moorabbin, and parts of the Cities of Oakleigh and Springvale.

A new electoral structure for Kingston was effected in November 2008. Under the new structure there are three wards – North Ward, Central Ward and South Ward, and three Councillors representing each ward. This makes a total of nine Councillors, instead of the previous structure of seven wards each represented by one Councillor, and as of November 2020 there are 11 wards each individually represented by a ward councillor.

Kingston's headquarters are located at the 7-storey '1230 Nepean Hwy' building, which has become a landmark to Cheltenham as well as the council. The A-Grade office building was built in 1993.

Schools
Primary education

Secondary education

Primary and secondary education
 Mentone Girls' Grammar School
 Mentone Grammar School

Townships and localities
The 2021 census, the city had a population of 158,129 up from 151,389 in the 2016 census

^ - Territory divided with another LGA

Railway stations
Aspendale
 Aspendale railway station – April 1891
Bonbeach
 Bonbeach railway station – February 1927
Carrum
 Carrum railway station – August 1882
Chelsea
 Chelsea railway station – February 1907
Cheltenham
 Cheltenham railway station – December 1881
Southland railway station – November 2017
Clayton South
 Westall railway station – February 1951
Edithvale
 Edithvale railway station – September 1919
Highett
 Highett railway station – December 1881
Mentone
 Mentone railway station – December 1881
Moorabbin
 Moorabbin railway station – December 1881
Mordialloc
 Mordialloc railway station – December 1881
Parkdale
 Parkdale railway station – September 1919

Library services
The City of Kingston operates nine free council run libraries.

Major branches
 Chelsea
 Cheltenham
 Clarinda
 Parkdale
 Westall

Minor branches
 Dingley
 Highett
 Moorabbin
 Patterson Lakes

Sport and recreation facilities
The City of Kingston operates two swimming and recreation centres:
 The Waves Leisure Centre which has a 50-metre swimming pool, spa, gym and separate wave pool.
 The Don Tatnell Leisure Centre which has a 25-metre swimming pool, spa and gym (closed as of 2021 due to structural damage).

Council structure

Corporate management
Chief Executive Officer, Peter Bean
General Manager, Customer & Corporate Support, Dan Hogan 

General Manager Planning and Development, Jonathan Guttmann

General Manager Organisational City Assets and Environment, Samantha Krull

General Manager Community Sustainability, Sally Jones

Chief Financial Officer, Bernard Rohan

Council services
The council has an annual budget of $245 million (2021–22), with works involving areas such as road maintenance and construction, community, cultural and youth activities, town planning and development, waste management and recycling, maintenance of parks and public areas, public health and animal control, library services, and business and tourism support.

Election results

As of November 2020 there are 11 wards each individually represented by a ward councillor. At the 2020 election, the councillors re-elected included Tamsin Bearsley, David Eden, George Hua, Georgina Oxley, and Steve Staikos. They were joined by newly elected councillors Tim Cochrane, Jenna Davey-Burns, Tracey Davies, Chris Hill, Cameron Howe and Hadi Saab.

Elected representatives

Starting in November 2020 the City of Kingston commenced a new ward system with 11 wards each electing a single Councillor. This new system was introduced by the Victorian Government under the Local Government Act 2020.

Councillors and Mayors 1997 - 2024 
Greg Alabaster 1997 – 2000 / 2005 - 2008

Ron Brownlees OAM 1997 – 2000 / 2000 – 2003 / 2008 – 2012 / 2012 – 2016 / 2016 – 2020 (Mayor: 1998-99, 2010-11 & 2012-13)

Di Comtesse 1997 - 2000

Lesley McGurgan 1997 – 2000 (Mayor: 1999-2000)

Bill Nixon OAM 1997 – 2000 / 2003 – 2005 / 2005 – 2008 (Mayor: 1997-98 & 2007-08)

John Ronke 1997 – 2000 / 2000 – 2003 / 2005 – 2008 / 2008 – 2012 / 2012 – 2016 (Mayor: 2011-12)

Dalene Salisbury 1997 – 2000

Arthur Athanasopoulos 2000 – 2003 / 2003 – 2005 / 2005 – 2008 / 2008 – 2012 (Mayor: 2000-01, 2003–04, March – December 2004, 2008–09)

Elizabeth Larking 2000 – 2003 / 2003 – 2005 (Mayor: 2001-02)

David Normington 2000-2001

Topsy Petchey OAM 2000 – 2003 / 2003 – 2005 / 2005 – 2008 (Mayor: 2002-03, 2004–05, 2005-06 & 2006-07)

Joanna van Klaveren 2000 - 2005

Trevor Shewan 2001 - 2003 / 2008 – 2012

Andrew Adams 2003 - 2005

Rosemary West OAM 2003 – 2005 / 2005 – 2008 / 2008 – 2012 / 2012 – 2016 / 2016 – 2020

Justin McKeegan 2005 – 2008

Donna Bauer 2008 – 2010

Lew Dundas 2008 – 2012

Paul Peulich 2008 – 2012 / 2012 – 2016 (Mayor: 2013-14)

Steve Staikos 2008 – 2012 / 2012 – 2016 / 2016 – 2020 / 2020 – 2024 (Mayor 2009-10, 2017–18, 2020-21 & 2021-22)

Dan Maloney 2011 – 2012

Tamara Barth 2012 – 2016 / 2016 – 2020

Geoff Gledhill 2012 – 2016 / 2016 – 2020 (Mayor: 2014-15)

Tamsin Bearsley 2012 – 2016 / 2016 – 2020 / 2020 – 2024 (Mayor: 2015-16)

David Eden 2012 – 2016 / 2016 – 2020 / 2020 – 2024 (Mayor: 2016-17)

George Hua 2016 – 2020 / 2020 – 2024

Georgina Oxley 2016 – 2020 / 2020 – 2024 (Mayor: 2018-19 & 2019-20)

Tim Cochrane 2020 – 2024

Jenna Davey Burns 2020 – 2024

Tracey Davies 2020 – 2024

Chris Hill 2020 – 2024

Cameron Howe 2020 – 2024

Hadi Saab 2020 – 2024

See also
 List of places on the Victorian Heritage Register in the City of Kingston

References

External links
 
Kingston City Council
Kingston Historical Website, in particular The Battle for Local Government: The Severance of Mordialloc from Moorabbin in 1920
Department for Victorian Communities Kingston City Council Municipality Profile (includes ward map)
Metlink local public transport for City of Kingston
Link to Land Victoria interactive maps

Local government areas of Melbourne
Greater Melbourne (region)